Stephen Patrick "Steven" Hancock (25 June 1957 – 24 June 2016) was a British sprint canoer who competed in the early 1980s. At the 1980 Summer Olympics in Moscow, he was eliminated in the semifinals of the K-4 1000 m event.

Hancock resided in Toronto with his family. He was CEO of VidWrx Inc., an Internet video production company. An avid cyclist, he was also a member of two clubs.

Hancock died on 24 June 2016 from injuries he sustained when a car struck his bicycle in Mississauga, Ontario, on 7 June. Hancock was placed on life support; however, his condition worsened and he died on the eve of his 59th birthday.

References

External links

1957 births
2016 deaths
Canoeists at the 1980 Summer Olympics
Olympic canoeists of Great Britain
Cycling road incident deaths
British male canoeists